The 2016 William Jones Cup was the 38th staging of William Jones Cup, an international basketball tournament. The men's tournament was held from 23–31 July 2016 at the Hsinchuang Gymnasium in New Taipei City, Taiwan. The women's tournament was held from 3–7 August 2016.

Mighty Sports won the cup with two games to spare, securing the fifth overall championship for the Philippines.

Men's tournament

Participating teams

Team standings

|}

Day 1

Day 2

Day 3

Day 4

Day 5

Day 6

Day 7

Day 8

Day 9

Women's tournament

Participating teams

Team standings

|}

Day 1

Day 2

Day 3

Day 4

Day 5

Awards

Men's tournament

Mythical Five
 Quincy Davis (Chinese Taipei A)
 Al Thornton  (Mighty Sports)
 Liu Cheng (Chinese Taipei A)
 Dewarick Spencer  (Mighty Sports)
 Lee Seoung-Hyun

Women's tournament

References

2016
2016–17 in Taiwanese basketball
2016–17 in American basketball
2016–17 in Asian basketball
2016 in African basketball